is a Japanese pole vaulter. He finished eighth at the  2005 World Youth Championships, seventh at the 2008 World Junior Championships and won the silver medal at the 2009 East Asian Games. He is the former national junior high school record holder (4.92 metres) and former national high school record holder (5.41 metres).

Personal bests

International competition

References

External links

Hiroki Sasase at JAAF 

1989 births
Living people
Sportspeople from Shizuoka Prefecture
Japanese male pole vaulters
Competitors at the 2011 Summer Universiade